Piletocera fluctualis is a moth in the family Crambidae. It was described by Johan Christian Fabricius in 1787. It is found on Tonga and the Cook Islands.

References

fluctualis
Moths described in 1787
Moths of Oceania